Matienzo is a village and a karst depression in Spain.

Matienzo may also refer to:
 Matienzo Base, a base and scientific research station in Argentine Antarctica
 Teniente General Benjamín Matienzo International Airport, in Tucumán Province, Argentina